"Caught a Lite Sneeze" is a song by American singer-songwriter Tori Amos, released as the first single from her third studio album, Boys for Pele (1996), on January 1, 1996. The song is about wanting to do anything to keep a relationship going, knowing that it is over. It references Nine Inch Nails's album Pretty Hate Machine in the lyrics "Caught a lite sneeze / Dreamed a little dream / Made my own pretty hate machine." On December 11, 1995, Atlantic Records made the song available for streaming on their website, one of the earliest examples of a major label implementing such a feature.

Following the song's release, it reached number 60 on the US Billboard Hot 100 and number 20 on the UK Singles Chart. Despite being one of her higher-charting singles, it does not appear on her best-of collection, Tales of a Librarian. In live performances from 1996 and 1998, Amos would frequently insert lines directly from and inspired by "Hurt", another song by Nine Inch Nails.

Critical reception
Larry Flick from Billboard felt the song "is easily her most viable bid for top 40 success to date." He added, "Literal, accessible lyrics waft over a rumbling rock-ish beat and a haunting blend of acoustic guitars and keyboard. Her often waif-like delivery is enhanced with throaty declarations and vamps that nicely punctuate the melody and flesh out the words. Nourishment for the intelligent pop music fan." Steve Baltin from Cash Box said "Wow", declaring the song as "simply stunning." He wrote, "If not the best singer in music right now, Amos is near the top of a very short list. Time and time again the passionate redhead has proven herself to be a vocalist capable of bringing listeners into her pain. “Caught A Lite Sneeze” begins with a very understated industrial feel and Amos showing great restraint in her vocals. By the end though, Amos has fans trembling with her cathartic rushes. A definite at Modern Rock and a smash at Triple A. The Cash Box psychic predicts that by the end of this year Tori Amos will have broken through to be a true superstar in every sense of the word."

Track listings

 US maxi-CD single
 "Caught a Lite Sneeze" (unedited version)
 "This Old Man"
 "That's What I Like Mick (The Sandwich Song)"
 "Graveyard"
 "Toodles Mr. Jim"

 UK CD1 and Australian CD single
 "Caught a Lite Sneeze" – 4:24
 "This Old Man" – 1:44
 "Hungarian Wedding Song" – 1:00
 "Toodles Mr. Jim" – 3:09

 UK CD2
 "Caught a Lite Sneeze" – 4:24
 "London Girls" – 3:20
 "That's What I Like Mick (The Sandwich Song)" – 2:59
 "Samurai" – 3:03

 UK and Australian cassette single, European CD single
 "Caught a Lite Sneeze" – 4:24
 "Graveyard" – 0:54
 "Toodles Mr. Jim" – 3:09

Personnel
Personnel are lifted from the Boys for Pele album booklet.

 Tori Amos – writing, vocals, harpsichord, Bösendorfer, production
 Alan Friedman – drum programming
 George Porter Jr. – bass
 Steve Caton – swells
 Mark Hawley – recording

 Marcel van Limbeek – recording
 Rob van Tuin – recording assistant
 Bob Clearmountain – mixing
 Ryan Freeland – mixing assistant
 Bob Ludwig – mastering

Charts

Release history

References

Tori Amos songs
1996 singles
1996 songs
Atlantic Records singles
East West Records singles
Music videos directed by Mike Lipscombe
Songs written by Tori Amos